The Sondheim Theatre (formerly the Queen's Theatre) is a West End theatre located in Shaftesbury Avenue on the corner of Wardour Street in the City of Westminster, London. It opened as the Queen's Theatre on 8 October 1907, as a twin to the neighbouring Hicks Theatre (now the Gielgud Theatre) which had opened ten months earlier. Both theatres were designed by W. G. R. Sprague. The theatre was Grade II listed by English Heritage in June 1972. 

In 2019 the theatre's name was changed from the Queen's to the Sondheim Theatre (after Stephen Sondheim) after a 20 week refurbishment. The theatre reopened on 18 December 2019.

History 
The original plan was to name the venue the Central Theatre. However, after lengthy debate, it was named the Queen's Theatre and a portrait of Queen Alexandra was hung in the foyer.

The first production at the Queen's Theatre was a comedy by Madeleine Lucette Ryley called The Sugar Bowl. Although it was poorly received and ran for only 36 performances, the theatre received glowing reviews. The Stage on 10 October 1907 described the theatre as:

In September 1940, a German bomb landed directly on the theatre, destroying the facade and lobby areas. The production at the time was Daphne du Maurier's Rebecca starring Celia Johnson, Owen Nares and Margaret Rutherford. The theatre remained closed until a £250,000 restoration was completed by Westwood Sons & Partners almost 20 years later. The auditorium retained its Edwardian decor, while the lobbies and exterior were rebuilt in a modern style. The reconstructed theatre opened on 8 July 1959 with John Gielgud's solo performance in Shakespeare speeches and sonnets, Ages of Man.

From April 2004 to July 2019, the theatre played host to Cameron Mackintosh's production of Les Misérables which transferred after 18 years at the nearby Palace Theatre. The musical celebrated its 20th anniversary at the venue on 8 October 2005 and overtook Cats as the longest-running musical of all time a year later on 8 October 2006.

2019 Refurbishment 
In 2019, Cameron Mackintosh announced that the original production of Les Misérables would close on 13 July 2019 while the theatre underwent a £13.8 million restoration, but would return in a new production from 18 December 2019, when the Queen's Theatre would be renamed as the Sondheim Theatre in honour of composer and lyricist Stephen Sondheim.

The theatre was extensively refurbished during the 20 week period. The Edwardian auditorium was recreated from the 1950s reconstruction with the addition of a curved rail and new boxes at dress circle level, named after Maggie Smith and Judi Dench. Overhangs and ceilings on each tier were also redecorated with a recurring Sprague-inspired cherub design in carved plaster and "fifteen colours and seven shades of gold". In total, approximately 70% of the plastering in the building was redone and a new, custom-made chandelier was hung.

The stage was also lowered 30cm to be closer to the audience, and 32 additional toilets were installed in a void space next door to the theatre. Additional space on every floor from the basement up was also reclaimed from a former electricity substation leased to the electric board in 1907. This allowed for more space on stage as well as additional dressing rooms on several floors, now fitted with showers. Finally, new seating was installed to improve audience comfort and sight-lines. 

Following completion the Sondheim Theatre re-opened on the 16th January 2020 for its first performance of Les Miserables in the 2009 touring staging.

Recent and present productions 
 The Hobbit (28 November 2001 – 9 February 2002) by Glyn Robbins from J. R. R. Tolkien's book
 Mysteries (26 February 2002 – 18 May 2002) adaptation by Speir Opera
 Umoja: The Spirit of Togetherness (18 June 2002 – 31 August 2002) by Todd Twala, Thenbi Nyandeni and Ian von Memerty
 Contact (23 October 2002 – 10 May 2003) by Susan Stroman and John Weildman
 The Rocky Horror Show (23 June 2003 – 5 July 2003) by Richard O'Brien, starring Jonathan Wilkes and John Stalker
 Cyberjam (23 September 2003 – 3 January 2004)
 The RSC's The Taming of the Shrew (15 January 2004 – 6 March 2004) by William Shakespeare
 The RSC's The Tamer Tamed (22 January 2004 – 6 March 2004) by John Fletcher
 Les Misérables (12 April 2004 — 13 July 2019, 18 December 2019–) by Alain Boublil and Claude-Michel Schönberg
 Les Misérables - The Staged Concert (5 December 2020 - 28 February 2021)

References 
Citations

Further reading
 Guide to British Theatres 1750–1950, John Earl and Michael Sell pp. 133–4 (Theatres Trust, 2000) 
 Who's Who in the Theatre, edited by John Parker, tenth edition, revised, London, 1947, pp. 477–478, 1183.

External links 

 Sondheim Theatre, London official website
 Theatre History

West End theatres
Theatres completed in 1907
Theatres in the City of Westminster
Grade II listed buildings in the City of Westminster
Grade II listed theatres
1907 establishments in England
Stephen Sondheim